Maging Sino Ka Man is a 1991 Filipino romantic comedy action film directed by Eddie Rodriguez and starring Robin Padilla and Sharon Cuneta. The film was a commercial success, and its production led to an actual romantic relationship between the two leads.

Plot
Famous singer Monique (Sharon Cuneta) escapes her home after her mother is in disbelief that her stepfather tried to assault her. She goes into hiding by altering her looks and assumes the name, Digna. She goes living in a shelter for women and works various odd jobs. With her past coming back to haunt her again, Monique's fate is altered with a chance encounter with Carding (Robin Padilla), a small, petty thief who looks after six orphaned children.

Cast

Sharon Cuneta as Monique/Digna
Robin Padilla as Carding Ermita
Edu Manzano as Gilbert
Vina Morales as Loleng
Rosemarie Gil as Beatrice
Suzanne Gonzales as Cleo
Dennis Padilla as Libag
Ali Sotto as Tala
Rez Cortez as Alex the hitman
Carmi Matic as Hika
Orestes Ojeda as Ben
Manjo del Mundo as Nick
Dick Israel as Pando
Malou de Guzman as Letty
Christopher Roxas as Tambok
Val Iglesias as Pick Pocket Rival
Romy Rivera as Osmundo

References

External links

1991 films
1990s romance films
Filipino-language films
Philippine romance films
Viva Films films
Films directed by Eddie Rodriguez